Leslie Keith Lewis (25 September 1929 – 10 October 2015) was an English first-class cricketer who played for Cambridge University in 1952 and 1953.

Keith Lewis attended Taunton School, where he was School Captain and played for the First XI, setting a record for the highest score for the school, 186 against Downside School, in 1948. After two years of National Service in the Army he went up to Pembroke College, Cambridge, to study Law and Economics. He gained his cricket and hockey blues, captaining the university hockey team. A middle-order batsman, his highest score was 53 not out against Surrey in 1953. He also played hockey for Middlesex.

After finishing his studies he was employed by the meat suppliers Borthwick and Sons for 23 years, including periods in Australia and New Zealand. He married Elizabeth Winyard in 1955, and they had two sons and a daughter. They were married for more than 60 years.

References

External links
 

1929 births
2015 deaths
People from East Finchley
People educated at Taunton School
Alumni of Pembroke College, Cambridge
English cricketers
English male field hockey players
Cambridge University cricketers